William III of Geneva (1280 - 1320) was the Count of Geneva from 1308 to 1320. He was the son of count Amadeus II of Geneva, and Agnès, daughter of John, Count of Chalon.

Biography
He was born in the region of Savoy-Maurienne. He had two brothers: Hugues, a layman, and Amatus, the bishop of Toul from 1321 to 1330.:245 His sister Jeanne married Guichard VI of Albon, nicknamed LeGrand, lord of Beaujeuet, his other sister, Marie, married Jean II de Chalon, Count of Auxerre:245 and son of John I of Chalon-Arlay (1259-1316).

In 1291, his father signed a peace treaty with the Counts of Savoy, to strengthen the family status by an alliance between the two families, William was betrothed to a daughter of the Counts of Savoy. Thus William must marry Agnès, the daughter of Amédée V. The contract was signed at the castle of Saint-Georges-d'Espéranche of the counts of Savoy, on August 31, 1297. By this agreement, the Count of Savoy gave 10,000 gold pounds in dowry and the castle of La Corbière to load tribute and on condition that the forces of the Count of Geneva prevent any attack, and that the family of Geneva brings 4,000 gold pounds and the bridge in front of the castle to his son, with the castles of Rumilly in Albanais, Hauteville, Alby,  as guarantee as well as other pledges.

Family and descendants
In 1297, William married Agnes of Savoy, daughter of Amadeus V, Count of Savoy, with issue:
 Amadeus III, born March 29, 1311, succeeded William as Count of Geneva, married Mahaut de Boulogne
 Marguerite, who married Aymar IV de Poitiers, the Count of Valentinois and Diois
 Yolande, who married Béraud, Count of Clermont
William also had an illegitimate son with Emeraude de La Frasse, lady of Montjoie:
 Pierre, called "Bastard of Geneva". He married Catherine of Ternier, sister of Jean de Ternier, founding the cadet branch of Genève-Lullin and Genève-Boringe.

Reign

William III takes power

It is unclear when Count William III took office.  mentions the hypothesis of Jules Vuy, who believed that the new count took office at some time before the death of Amadeus. This observation was based on the analysis of a charter, not original, of 1308.:247 The historian Matthieu de la Corbière; however, indicates "by a transaction concluded on May 29, his eldest son Guillaume took over".

The succession raised certain concerns, especially between the young count and his mother, Agnes of Chalon. In 1306, during the writing of the will, William was a minor and therefore a regency by his mother had been anticipated. Two years later, the young count was of age to lead. A transaction is set up between the two parties, on May 29, 1308, by the executor, Jean I of Chalon-Arlay, brother of Agnes, and under the auspices of the Bishop of Geneva. Three years later, a new transaction was established in favor of the count by Jean de Chalon and reducing the share of inheritance of his mother, forcing her to renounce all claims on the county. In exchange, the count undertakes to defend the possessions of his mother. This act is guaranteed in February in particular by the Dauphin John II of Viennois, the son of the count Savoy Edward and Guichard VI de Beaujeu.

The reign of William III was most likely influenced by his wife from the house of Savoy. The new count committed to peace with the County of Savoy. At the peace treaty between the Count of Savoy and the Great Dauphine Béatrice of August 1308, William "vouches for his execution". On October 23, 1308, he signs with Count Amadeus V, a treaty of perpetual peace at the castle of Saint-Georges-d'Espéranche. Finally, on January 21, 1312, the sons of the count of Savoy, Édouard and Aymon, signed an agreement committing the various parties to divide the barony of Faucigny, in case of death without heir of Lord Hugues. An event in April 1312 committed the signatories of the agreement to intervene. A vassal of Baron de Faucigny, Guillaume-Albi Lucinge, committed a murder, and the lords of Savoy and Geneva intervened by taking the castle Lucinges and destroy. The count, resumed his old alliance, with the Dauphin of Viennois, the bishops of Geneva and Lausanne. He also paid tribute to the Dauphin of Viennois, recognizing holding in fief his county and various castles of this lord, June 13, 1316.

Death and succession 
On April 11, 1319, Count William wrote his will at the castle of Annecy, naming as heir his son Amédée, and in the event that Amédée son died childless, he made his brothers Hugues and Amédée his successors.270 In his will, he left a rente (annuity) of thirty livres a year to each of his brothers, a hundred to his mother, Agnès of Chalon, and to his wife Agnès of Savoy, her dowry and a life interest in the Vallée des Clefs and the castle of Charousse. This was supplemented by donations to the Church and its institutions. William died in 1320.

See also
 Bishop of Geneva
 Counts of Geneva
 History of Geneva

References

 
 Public Acts, Registry of Geneva, File: Régeste genevois, Actes publiés dans le Régeste genevois (1866), que l'on peut consulter en ligne dans le Répertoire chronologique des sources sur le site digi-archives.org de la Fondation des Archives historiques de l'Abbaye territoriale de Saint-Maurice d'Agaune|Abbaye de Saint-Maurice (Suisse), Abbey of Saint-Maurice, Geneva, Switzerland, 1968.
 Geneva / Genève, by Paul Guichonnet, 11 février 2010.
 Michel Germain, Personnages illustres des Savoie, éditeur Autre Vue, 2007 .
 Matthieu de la Corbière, L'invention et la défense des frontières dans le diocèse de Genève. Étude des principautés et de l'habitat fortifié (XII-XIV), éditeur, Académie salésienne, Annecy, France, 2002.
 Archives of Geneva, L'invention et la défense des frontières dans le diocèse de Genève, Switzerland 2002.

House of Geneva
Counts of Geneva
1320 deaths
1280 births